The Growing Pains of Adrian Mole, is an epistolary novel by Sue Townsend. It is the second in the Adrian Mole series. It focuses on the worries and regrets of a teenage aspiring intellectual and, like its predecessor, takes the form of a diary. The story takes place from 1982 to mid-1983. Prominent events in this volume are the breakup and later reconciliation of Adrian and Pandora, Adrian's attempt to run away from home and subsequent breakdown, the birth of his sister Rosie Mole, and Adrian's general worry about his O levels and nuclear war.

Plot summary

Adrian Mole is an outsider who feels the reason he can't quite fit in with "regular" society is that he is an intellectual. Evidence from his diary entries include a precocious interest in literature, in left-wing politics, a desire to have his own poetry show on the BBC, his dislike of Margaret Thatcher and his frequent critiques of his less-refined schoolmates and family. Adrian's dysfunctional family, as in The Secret Diary of Adrian Mole, is one of the focal points of the book.

Although portrayed as somewhat vain and self-centred, Adrian is the only friend and frequent caretaker of the OAP Bert Baxter, and also shows a great deal of concern and compassion for the misfortunes of his parents and respect for the authority of his grandmother.

This book continues the theme from the first book of Adrian's growing frustration with his body. He constantly writes about the "spots" that mar his complexion, and he also has self-esteem issues about his height and physical maturity.

As his frustrations mount, Adrian decides to run away to London but then decides that would be the first place his parents would look and so runs away instead to Grimsby.

Critical reception
Reviewing the book for The Financial Times, Martin Seymour-Smith wrote that it was "quite as classic" as its predecessor.

References

1984 British novels
British young adult novels
Fictional diaries
Novels set in Leicestershire
Novels set in the 1980s
Adrian Mole novels
Methuen Publishing books
Novels about dysfunctional families